Laphangium is a genus of plants in the family Asteraceae.

 Species
 Laphangium affine (D.Don) Tzvelev - Turkey, Republic of Georgia
 Laphangium luteoalbum (L.) Tzvelev - Europe, Middle East, North Africa
 Laphangium teydeum Wildpret & Greuter - Canary Islands

References

Gnaphalieae
Asteraceae genera